Troublesome Night 7 is a 2000 Hong Kong horror comedy film produced and directed by Nam Yin. It is the seventh of the 20 films in the Troublesome Night film series.

Plot
A film crew travels to a remote island to shoot a music video. The island is inhabited by some villagers and an eccentric police detective. Paranormal events occur during their stay: eerie screams are heard at night but the villagers dismiss them as wolves' howling; a strange young man is seen wandering around, asking whether they had seen someone called Ying. In addition, while shooting a scene in the water, the actresses felt something tickling their feet. An old woman narrates a tragic story about a pair of lovers from the village who were separated from each other because the woman's father opposed the relationship — the man was burnt to death while the woman drowned herself at sea. A mysterious feral child is revealed to be the one responsible for making the screams, and the old woman recognises him as the lovers' long-lost son. A ritual is performed to put the lovers' spirits to rest and their son is adopted by the villagers.

Cast
 Louis Koo as Lok
 Nadia Chan as Ying
 Simon Lui as Detective Lui
 Amanda Lee as Amanda Li
 Wayne Lai as Alex Cheung
 Frankie Ng as Hung
 May Law as Fa
 Celia Sze as Yu
 Hui Siu-hung as Tat
 Michael Tsui as Keung
 Law Lan as Granny Ping
 Pang Ka-lai as Lai
 Gregory Lee as Ho
 Oscar Leung as Lok and Ying's son
 Gordon Leung as Gordon
 Cub Chin as village chief
 Lee Wai-ki as Kenji
 Ho Fat-sang as Dee

External links
 
 

Hong Kong comedy horror films
2000s Cantonese-language films
Troublesome Night (film series)
2000 comedy horror films
2000 films
2000s Hong Kong films